The Great Band Era is a compilation album featuring Swing music from 1936-1945. Reader's Digest released the album in 1965. In 1988, the Recording Industry Association of America certified 9 million sales of the album – making it one of the top selling albums ever within the United States. The album was released as a ten LP album box set. The album included many swing favorites, as well as new recordings.

Promotion 
Reader's Digest sent out a free promotional record before releasing the album. Voiced by Vaughn Monroe, the record boasted that in The Great Band Era, RCA Victor sound engineers had "remove[d] all the irritating noise and scratchiness that was always present on the original records, even when they were brand new."

Music
The records contains mostly swing standards by major swing bands. It included an entire LP of "theme songs", or songs particularly associated or played exceptionally often by a band. Besides previous swing recordings, the album also contained some song versions released for the first time, including a version of Blues in the Night by Tommy Dorsey and Jo Stafford.

Restored Audio
This was one of the first LP releases to introduce the concept of audio restoration to the general public. although that term was not yet in general use.  As mentioned above, a free promotional paper record was sent to Reader's Digest subscribers introducing the set, with Vaughn Monroe presenting "Before" and "After" versions of one of the songs to demonstrate what had been done to enhance the sound.  As described in the booklet accompanying the records, each song was transferred from a new matrix, then electronically treated to remove surface noise as well as "ticks" and "pops."  Although there is still some residual surface noise on a few of the tracks, the restoration overall was remarkably successful.

Sales
According to the RIAA, The Great Band Era sold over 9 million copies in the United States, making it one of the best selling-albums of all time within the country. In addition, the Australian Recording Industry Association certified the album as gold in 1999.

Track list
From Discogs.

References

Reader's Digest
Swing albums
Jazz compilation albums
1971 compilation albums
RCA Victor compilation albums